Wuxia is a genre of Chinese fiction about martial heroes.

Wuxia may also refer to:
Dragon (2011 film), martial-arts film directed by Peter Chan
Wu Gorge, one of the Three Gorges on the Yangtze River, between Chongqing and Hubei
Wuxia, Chongqing, a town in Wushan County, Chongqing, China
Wuxia Subdistrict, Dongli District, Tianjin, China